The 2005 Miami Masters (also known as the NASDAQ-100 Open for sponsorship reasons) was a tennis tournament played on outdoor hard courts. It was the 21st edition of this tournament, and was part of the ATP Masters Series of the 2005 ATP Tour, and of the Tier I Series of the 2005 WTA Tour. Both the men's and the women's events took place at the Tennis Center at Crandon Park in Key Biscayne, Florida, United States, from March 21 through April 3, 2005.

Finals

Men's singles

 Roger Federer defeated  Rafael Nadal, 2–6, 6–7(4–7), 7–6(7–5), 6–3, 6–1

Women's singles

 Kim Clijsters defeated  Maria Sharapova, 6–3, 7–5

Men's doubles

 Jonas Björkman &  Max Mirnyi defeated  Wayne Black &  Kevin Ullyett, 6–1, 6–2

Women's doubles

 Svetlana Kuznetsova &  Alicia Molik defeated  Lisa Raymond &  Rennae Stubbs, 7–5, 6–7(5–7), 6–2

External links
Official website
Men's singles draw
Men's doubles draw
Men's qualifying singles draw
Women's singles, doubles and qualifying draws

 
NASDAQ-100 Open
NASDAQ-100 Open
NASDAQ-100 Open
Miami Open (tennis)
NASDAQ-100 Open
NASDAQ-100 Open
NASDAQ-100 Open